Lieutenant en second was a junior officer rank in the French Royal Army prior to the French Revolution. Like most of the officer ranks in the Royal Army, it was dominated by nobles. High-ranking nobles entering military service during their teenage years would serve in the rank at ages as young as 15 or 16 years old before rapidly being promoted. One such example was Louis des Balbes de Berton de Crillon, duc de Mahon, who joined the Régiment du Roi (King's Regiment) in 1734, aged 16, as a lieutenant en second before being promoted the following year to lieutenant en premier. Lesser nobles would stay in the rank for longer, while the few commoners who had been able to become officer of fortune might remain as lieutenants en second until they died or retired.

The rank of Lieutenant en second was also used in the British army during the eighteenth century. The origin of the rank seems to have arisen from the need to support the responsibilities of those in higher ranks. Each of a regiment's field officers — its Colonel, Lieutenant Colonel, and Major — originally commanded their own Companies, as well as carrying out their regimental duties. It became the practice for the Colonel's and Lieutenant Colonel's companies to include one or two additional officers with the rank of Lieutenant a pied and/or Lieutenant en second. Regiments' organisation varied, and was changed from time to time. These ranks appear to have been abolished some time early in the nineteenth century.

References

Military ranks of France